1350 Rosselia, provisional designation , is a stony Koronian asteroid from the outer regions of the asteroid belt, approximately 22 kilometers in diameter. Discovered by astronomer Eugène Delporte at the Royal Observatory of Belgium in 1934, the asteroid was later named after Marie-Thérèse Rossel, editor of the Belgian newspaper Le Soir.

Discovery 

Rosselia was discovered on 3 October 1934, by Belgian astronomer Eugène Delporte at the Royal Observatory of Belgium in Uccle. One month later, it was independently discovered by German astronomer Richard Schorr at the Bergedorf Observatory, Hamburg, on 3 November 1934. The Minor Planet Center only recognizes the first discoverer.

Orbit and classification 

Rosselia is a member of the Koronis family, a very large asteroid family with nearly co-planar ecliptical orbits in the outer main belt. It orbits the Sun at a distance of 2.6–3.1 AU once every 4 years and 10 months (1,764 days; semi-major axis of 2.86 AU). Its orbit has an eccentricity of 0.09 and an inclination of 3° with respect to the ecliptic.

The body's observation arc begins at Lowell Observatory in September 1929, or five years prior to its official discovery observation at Uccle.

Physical characteristics 

In the Tholen classification, Rosselia is a common S-type asteroid. In the SMASS classification it is an Sa-subtype that transitions to the rare A-type asteroids.

Rotation period and poles 

Several rotational lightcurve of Rosselia have been obtained from photometric observations since 1975. Consolidated lightcurve-analysis gave a well-defined rotation period of 8.140 hours with a brightness amplitude between 0.3 and 0.54 magnitude.

Modeling of the asteroid's lightcurve gave two concurring periods of 8.14008 and 8.14011 hours, with two determined spin axis of (67.0°, −64.0°) and (246.0°, −58.0°) in ecliptic coordinates (λ, β).

Diameter and albedo 

According to the surveys carried out by the Infrared Astronomical Satellite IRAS, the Japanese Akari satellite and the NEOWISE mission of NASA's Wide-field Infrared Survey Explorer, Rosselia measures between 20.822 and 23.35 kilometers in diameter and its surface has an albedo between 0.1579 and 0.199.

The Collaborative Asteroid Lightcurve Link adopts the results obtained by IRAS, that is, an albedo of 0.1579 and a diameter of 23.35 kilometers based on an absolute magnitude of 10.78.

Naming 

This minor planet was named after Marie-Thérèse Rossel (1910–1987), a Belgian businesswoman and editor of the Brussels newspaper Le Soir. The official naming citation was mentioned in The Names of the Minor Planets by Paul Herget in 1955. Asteroid 1366 Piccolo was also named after an editor of Le Soir by Delporte.

References

External links 
 Asteroid Lightcurve Database (LCDB), query form (info )
 Dictionary of Minor Planet Names, Google books
 Asteroids and comets rotation curves, CdR – Observatoire de Genève, Raoul Behrend
 Discovery Circumstances: Numbered Minor Planets (1)-(5000) – Minor Planet Center
 
 

001350
Discoveries by Eugène Joseph Delporte
Named minor planets
001350
001350
19341003